Uzen can refer to:

 Uzen Province, Japan
 Uzen, Kazakhstan
 Bolshoy Uzen River
 Maly Uzen River